Arene centrifuga is a species of sea snail, a marine gastropod mollusc in the family Areneidae.

Description

The shell can grow to be 3.5 mm in length.

Distribution
Arene centrifuga can be found off of Cuba.

References

Areneidae
Gastropods described in 1896